Bluff Point may refer to:

 Bluff Point, Western Australia, a suburb of Geraldton
 Bluff Point State Park, Connecticut, United States
 Bluff Point, Indiana, United States, an unincorporated community
 Bluff Point (South Georgia)
 Bluff Point, Keuka Lake, New York, United States, location of the prehistoric Bluff Point Stoneworks